Charles Shaar Murray (born Charles Maximillian Murray; 27 June 1951) is an English music journalist and broadcaster. He has worked on the New Musical Express and many other magazines and newspapers, and has been interviewed for a number of television documentaries and reports on music.

Biography
Murray grew up in Reading, Berkshire, England, where he attended Reading Grammar School and learnt to play the harmonica and guitar. His first experience in journalism came in 1970, when he was one of a number of schoolchildren who responded to an invitation to edit the April issue of the satirical magazine Oz. He thus contributed to the notorious Schoolkids OZ issue and was involved in the consequent obscenity trial.

He then wrote for IT (International Times), before moving to the New Musical Express in 1972 for which he wrote until around 1986. He subsequently worked for a number of publications including Q magazine, Mojo, MacUser, New Statesman, Prospect, The Guardian, The Observer, The Daily Telegraph, Vogue, and The Independent. He currently  writes a monthly column about his lifelong love affair with guitars in Guitarist magazine.

Bibliography
In addition to his magazine work, Murray has written a number of books.

Non-fiction
David Bowie: An Illustrated Record (1981), with Roy Carr, 
Crosstown Traffic: Jimi Hendrix and Post-War Pop (1989), a musical biography of Jimi Hendrix, ; won the Ralph Gleason Music Book Award
Shots From The Hip (1991), selected writings from his first two decades as a journalist
Blues on CD: The Essential Guide (1993), 
Boogie Man: Adventures of John Lee Hooker in the American 20th Century (1999), a biography of John Lee Hooker, ; shortlisted for the Gleason award.

Novels
The Hellhound Sample (2011),

Broadcasting
His broadcasting credits include:
"The Seven Ages of Rock" (BBC2, 2007) as series consultant and interviewee
"The South Bank Show" (ITV, 2006) Dusty Springfield – interviewee
"Inky Fingers: The NME Story" (BBC2, 2005) – interviewee
"Dancing in the Street" (BBC2) – series consultant
"Jazz From Hell: Frank Zappa" (BBC Radio 3) writer and presenter
"Punk Jazz: Jaco Pastorius" (BBC R3) writer and presenter
"The Life and Crimes of Lenny Bruce" (BBC R3) writer and presenter

Performance
Murray also sang and played guitar and harmonica as Blast Furnace in the band Blast Furnace and the Heatwaves and currently performs with London blues band Crosstown Lightnin'.

References

External links
 
 Professional biography

1951 births
Living people
writers from Reading, Berkshire
English blues guitarists
English male guitarists
Rhythm and blues guitarists
English music journalists
English music critics
Labour Party (UK) people
NME writers
People educated at Reading School
Rock critics